Leatrice M. Morin (October 23, 1922 - July 1, 2009) was an American politician from Maine. Morin, a Democrat from Old Orchard Beach, Maine, served in the Maine House of Representatives from 1973 to 1976.

Morin was born in Saco, Maine in 1922 and graduated from Thornton Academy in 1940. She is a graduate of the Southern Maine Vocational Technical Institute.

References

1922 births
2009 deaths
People from Saco, Maine
People from Old Orchard Beach, Maine
Southern Maine Community College alumni
Democratic Party members of the Maine House of Representatives
Women state legislators in Maine
20th-century American politicians
20th-century American women politicians
21st-century American women
Thornton Academy alumni